Tetsuya Iida (飯田 哲也, born May 18, 1968 in Chōfu, Tokyo, Japan) is a former Nippon Professional Baseball outfielder.

Iida is best known by completing Pro Sportsman No.1 earned winning two times in 1995 (as the first tournament winner would be inducted in the Hall of Fame) and 1999.

External links

1968 births
Living people
People from Tokyo
Japanese baseball players
Nippon Professional Baseball outfielders
Yakult Swallows players
Tohoku Rakuten Golden Eagles players
Japanese baseball coaches
Nippon Professional Baseball coaches